The Bishop of Argentina is a bishop in the Anglican communion, the head of the Anglican Diocese of Argentina within the Anglican Church of South America.

The diocese was founded in 1910 from the Diocese of the Falkland Islands.

The diocesan seat is the cathedral of St John the Baptist in Buenos Aires, which at one time succeeded the Falkland Islands as the episcopal seat for the whole of South America  but it is now the seat for the Diocese of Argentina only.

The incumbent diocesan bishop is Brian Williams, who was appointed in 2020.

List of Bishops

 1869-1900   Waite Hockin Stirling
 1902–1937   Edward Francis Every
 1937–1945   John Reginald Weller
 1946–1962   Daniel Ivor Evans
 1963–1975   Cyril James Tucker
 1975–1989   Richard Stanley Cutts
 1990-2002   David Leake
 2002–2020   Gregory James Venables
 2020-       Brian Roger Williams

References